The 1980–81 NCAA Division I men's basketball season began on November 28, 1980, progressed through the regular season and conference tournaments, and concluded with the 1981 NCAA Division I men's basketball tournament championship game on March 30, 1981, at The Spectrum in Philadelphia. The Indiana Hoosiers won their fourth NCAA national championship with a 63–50 victory over the North Carolina Tar Heels.

Rule Changes 
 On free throw attempts, players can now enter the free-throw lane after the foul shooter releases the ball. Previously, players had to wait until the ball touched either the rim or backboard before entering the lane.
 The time allotted to replace a disqualified (fouled out) player was reduced from 60 to 30 seconds.
 Starting in the 1981–82 season, the national third-place game was abolished.
 Conferences were allowed to experiment with the three-point shot in conference games only. The Southern Conference was the first to use the shot in their conference games, adopting a distance of 22 feet.

Season headlines 
 After a nearly even first half, the Indiana Hoosiers pulled away from the North Carolina Tar Heels to clinch the school's fourth National championship, 63–50 in Philadelphia. The win marked Hoosiers coach Bob Knight's second championship and marked UNC coach Dean Smith's sixth trip to the Final Four without a championship. Indiana was led by a dominant second half by sophomore Isiah Thomas.
 There was some question as to if the March 30th championship game would be postponed or cancelled as President Ronald Reagan was shot in an assassination attempt by John Hinckley, Jr. Once it was confirmed that President Reagan would survive, the game was played as scheduled.
 Oregon State senior Steve Johnson set an NCAA record for season field goal percentage with a .746 mark. Johnson would also graduate with the NCAA career field goal percentage record (.678)
 Nolan Richardson led Tulsa to a 15-game improvement over the previous year in his first year at the helm. The Golden Hurricane went 26–7 and won the NIT. Richardson came to Tulsa fresh off of a 1980 NJCAA Championship and brought four of his former Western Texas College starters to Tulsa, including Paul Pressey.
 The Mid-Eastern Athletic Conference played its first season as a member of NCAA's Division I.

Season outlook

Pre-season polls 

The top 20 from the AP and UPI polls during the pre-season.

Regular season

Conference winners and tournaments 

Note: From 1975 to 1982, the Eastern College Athletic Conference (ECAC), a loosely organized sports federation of Northeastern colleges and universities, organized Division I ECAC regional tournaments for those of its members that were independents in basketball. Each 1981 tournament winner received an automatic bid to the 1981 NCAA Division I men's basketball tournament in the same way that the tournament champions of conventional athletic conferences did. The ECAC North was a separate, conventional conference.

Informal championships 

NOTE: All five teams finished with a 2–2 record in head-to-head competition, resulting in a five-way tie.

Statistical leaders

Post-season tournaments

NCAA tournament 

Indiana won its fourth NCAA title with a 63–50 win over North Carolina and coach Dean Smith. Precocious sophomore Isiah Thomas was named Final Four Most Outstanding Player in a title game delayed due to the shooting of President Ronald Reagan.

Final Four 
Played at The Spectrum in Philadelphia

 Third Place – Virginia 78, LSU 74

National Invitation tournament 

Coach Nolan Richardson led Tulsa to the NIT Championship in his first year as a division I head coach – an 86–84 win over Syracuse. The Golden Hurricane's Greg Stewart was named the tournament's Most Valuable Player.

NIT Semifinals and Final 
Played at Madison Square Garden in New York City

 Third Place – Purdue 75, West Virginia 72

Awards

Consensus All-American teams

Major player of the year awards 

 Wooden Award: Danny Ainge, BYU
 Naismith Award: Ralph Sampson, Virginia
 Helms Player of the Year: Mark Aguirre, DePaul
 Associated Press Player of the Year: Ralph Sampson, Virginia
 UPI Player of the Year: Ralph Sampson, Virginia
 NABC Player of the Year: Danny Ainge, BYU
 Oscar Robertson Trophy (USBWA): Ralph Sampson, Virginia
 Adolph Rupp Trophy: Ralph Sampson, Virginia
 Sporting News Player of the Year: Mark Aguirre, DePaul

Major coach of the year awards 

 Associated Press Coach of the Year: Ralph Miller, Oregon State
 Henry Iba Award (USBWA): Ralph Miller, Oregon State
 NABC Coach of the Year: Jack Hartman, Kansas State & Ralph Miller, Oregon State
 UPI Coach of the Year: Ralph Miller, Oregon State
 CBS/Chevrolet Coach of the Year: Dale Brown, LSU
 Sporting News Coach of the Year: Dale Brown, LSU

Other major awards 

 Frances Pomeroy Naismith Award (Best player under 6'0): Terry Adolph, West Texas State
 Robert V. Geasey Trophy (Top player in Philadelphia Big 5): John Pinone, Villanova
 NIT/Haggerty Award (Top player in New York City metro area): Gary Springer, Iona

Coaching changes 

A number of teams changed coaches during the season and after it ended.

References 

 
NCAA